Alexander Weiss (born January 29, 1987) is a German professional ice hockey forward who currently plays for the Schwenninger Wild Wings of the Deutsche Eishockey Liga (DEL). Weiss originally played with Eisbären Berlin of the DEL.

Playing career
After five seasons with Kölner Haie, Weiss out of contract opted to sign for his third DEL club, agreeing to a three-year deal with Grizzlys Wolfsburg on May 2, 2016.

Weiss enjoyed three seasons with the Wing Wings, leaving at the conclusion of the 2018–19 season, after he was limited to 8 points in 23 games through injury. On March 12, 2019, Weiss joined his fourth DEL club, agreeing to a one-year deal with the Schwenninger Wild Wings.

Career statistics

International

References

External links

1987 births
Living people
German ice hockey forwards
Eisbären Berlin players
Kölner Haie players
Schwenninger Wild Wings players
Grizzlys Wolfsburg players